The 2002 Angola Basketball Super Cup (9th edition) was contested by Primeiro de Agosto, as the 2001 league champion and Petro Atlético, the 2001 cup winner. Primeiro de Agosto was the winner, making it is's 2nd title.

The 2002 Women's Super Cup (7th edition) was contested by Primeiro de Agosto, as the 2001 women's league champion and Maculusso, the 2001 cup runner-up. Primeiro de Agosto was the winner, making it is's 1st title.

2002 Men's Super Cup

2002 Women's Super Cup

See also
 2002 Angola Basketball Cup
 2002 BAI Basket

References

Angola Basketball Super Cup seasons
Super Cup